Juraj Nvota (born 1 March 1954) is a Slovak actor and film director.

Selected filmography

Director

Actor

External links
 

1954 births
Living people
Film people from Bratislava
Slovak male film actors
Slovak film directors
Sun in a Net Awards winners
20th-century Slovak male actors
21st-century Slovak male actors
Actors from Bratislava